Leo Joseph Sexton (August 27, 1909 – September 6, 1968) was an American shot putter who won a gold medal at the 1932 Summer Olympics. Sexton was the world record holder for nearly a month in 1932. Despite his large frame (1.93 m, 108 kg), he cleared 1.96 m in the high jump in 1929. After retiring from sports he worked in insurance, becoming vice-president of a company in Perry, Oklahoma.

References

External links

 profile

1909 births
1968 deaths
American male shot putters
Olympic gold medalists for the United States in track and field
Athletes (track and field) at the 1932 Summer Olympics
Georgetown Hoyas men's track and field athletes
World record setters in athletics (track and field)
People from Danvers, Massachusetts
Sportspeople from Essex County, Massachusetts
Track and field athletes from Massachusetts
Medalists at the 1932 Summer Olympics